Suttor is a surname. Notable people with the surname include:

Dudley Suttor (1892–1962), Australian who played rugby union for Australia
Francis Bathurst Suttor (1839–1915), Australian pastoralist and politician, son of William Henry Suttor
George Suttor (1774–1859), pioneer settler of Australia, father of William Henry and John Bligh Suttor
John Bligh Suttor (1809–1886), Australian politician, brother of William Henry Suttor
Rory Suttor (born 1998), Australian rugby union player
Timothy Suttor (1926–1997), Australian Catholic theologian
William Henry Suttor (1805–1877), an Australian pastoralist and politician, father of William Suttor Jr. and Francis Bathurst Suttor
William Suttor Jr. (1834–1905), Australian politician and pastoralist, son of William Henry Suttor

See also
Suttor River, river in Central Queensland, named after William Henry Suttor
Suttor River Causeway (built 1876), heritage-listed crossing of the Suttor River
Suttor Developmental Road, State Route 11, Queensland, that crosses the Suttor River
Suttor, Queensland, locality near the Suttor River